Lori Brown may refer to:
 Lori Lipman Brown (born 1958), American politician and activist
Lori Brown (architect) (born 1969), American architect